Friesinger may refer to:

People
Janina Urszula Friesinger, née Korowicka, (born 1954),  a former ice speed skater from Poland
Anni Friesinger-Postma (born 1977 in Bad Reichenhall), a German female speed skater, daughter of the above

Companies
 Friesinger's Candies, an Ohio-based confectionery company

German-language surnames